Be Human is a 1936 Fleischer Studios animated short film starring Betty Boop and Grampy. It is now in the public domain.

Plot
Betty Boop is incensed at her farmer neighbor's cruelty to his animals. But the inventive Grampy knows how to teach him a lesson.

The abusive farmer has been compared to Billy Joe Gregg, who abused numerous cows and calves at the Conklin Dairy Farms in Ohio in 2010.

Song
The cartoon features the song Be Human sung by Betty Boop accompanying herself on piano.  Instrumental renditions of the song are also prominent throughout the cartoon.  When the animal-abusing farmer winds up on Grampy's punishment treadmill, a phonograph recording of Grampy's voice is heard singing the song.

See also 
Cruelty to animals
Animal welfare
Vigilantism
A Song a Day-The animated short with Betty Boop and Grampy in a humane animal hospital
Animal rights

Notes

External links
 Downloadable cartoon at archive.org (public domain, MPEG4, 7.6MB)
 
 

1936 short films
1930s English-language films
Films about animal rights
1930s American animated films
American black-and-white films
Betty Boop cartoons
1936 animated films
Paramount Pictures short films
Fleischer Studios short films
Short films directed by Dave Fleischer
American comedy short films
American animated short films
Animated films about animals
Films about old age
Films set on farms